Prakrit Bharati Academy is a public library established on 21 February 1977 in Jaipur with the prime goal to publish books in Prakrit, Sanskrit, Hindi other Indian languages in simplified English to benefit pursuance of wisdom for laymen and scholars alike. Spread over 3368.84 meters surrounded by Universities and Engineering institutes on Calgary road on Malviya Nagar area, It is also recognized by several universities as an eminent Library (475/1976-77), Study Center and Publication House. It incubates around 300 readers on daily basis in its premises. It is also considered as a prominent literary and cultural organisation involved mainly in publication and research activities. It also conduct post-graduate courses. The academy is the coaching and examination center for post-graduate correspondence courses in Jain Philosophy conducted by Jain Vishva Bharti.

Publications
The academy had published more than 335 books and 60 comic serials. It have also published a large number of translated work mainly in English and Hindi of publications of classical languages like Prakrit, Sanskrit, Persian, Chinese etc. to revive their vanishing literature. The Encyclopedia of Aprigraha is an important research work published by the academy.

Library
The reference library houses more than 80,000 books of great cultural significance which is regularly updated to enrich its collection further. It obliged to institutions and individuals who contribute generously in this regard. There are more than 4500 members of the library mainly students and scholars. This library primarily caters to researchers of the academy.

Digitization lab
It also incubates a state of art Micro-filming lab equipped with advanced scanners to facilitate the digitization of national and international literary work of great cultural value and importance like old books and even manuscripts.

References

Jain organisations
Jain universities and colleges
Public libraries in India
Education in Jaipur
Libraries established in 1977
1977 establishments in Rajasthan